Linli railway station is a railway station in Linli County, Changde, Hunan, China. It is an intermediate stop on the Shimen–Changsha railway.

On 25 April 2014, the station was closed for construction work as part of the project to add a second track to the line. Initially expected to reopen in April 2015, it actually reopened in September 2016.

References 

Railway stations in Hunan
Railway stations in China opened in 1997